RMBS may refer to:
 Residential mortgage-backed security
 Royal Marines Band Service
 Rambus, ticker symbol